The Delaware Constitution of 1792 was the second governing document for Delaware state government. The Constitution was in effect from its adoption, on June 12, 1792, until it was replaced, on December 2, 1831, by a new Constitution.

Members of the Delaware Constitutional Convention of 1792. The Convention convened in 1792 and adjourned June 12, 1792.

Thomas Montgomery, President
Robert Armstrong
Andrew Barratt
Richard Bassett
John W. Batson
Isaac Beauchamp
John M. Clayton
Isaac Cooper
Robert Coram
John Dickinson
Benjamin Dill
Manlove Emerson
Robert Haughey
Kensey Johns
William Johnson
George Mitchell
Henry Molleston
George Monro
James Morris
Daniel Polk
Nicholas Ridgely
Edward Roche
Rhoads Shankland
Thomas White

References

See also
Delaware Constitution of 1776
Delaware Constitution of 1831
Delaware Constitution of 1897, current

1792 in Delaware
1792 in American law
1792 documents
Constitution of 1792
Defunct state constitutions of the United States